Henrik Koltai (born 11 May 1913, date of death unknown) was a Hungarian athlete. He competed in the men's long jump at the 1936 Summer Olympics.

References

1913 births
Year of death missing
Athletes (track and field) at the 1936 Summer Olympics
Hungarian male long jumpers
Olympic athletes of Hungary
Place of birth missing